Gerovasa is an abandoned village in the Limassol District of Cyprus, located 6 km west of Malia. In 1960 the majority of the inhabitants were Turkish Cypriots.

References

Communities in Limassol District